Ahmad Al Douni (born 4 February 1989) is a Syrian footballer who plays as a forward.

International career

International goals
Syria's score listed first; score column indicates score after each Al Douni goal.

References

External links
 
 Career stats at goalzz.com

1989 births
Living people
Syrian footballers
Al-Shorta Damascus players
Al-Ramtha SC players
Al-Quwa Al-Jawiya players
Duhok SC players
Al-Zawraa SC players
Najaf FC players
Riffa SC players
Mesaimeer SC players
Al-Markhiya SC players
Al Jeel Club players
Qatari Second Division players
Association football forwards
Syria international footballers
Expatriate footballers in Bahrain
Expatriate footballers in Iraq
Expatriate footballers in Qatar
Expatriate footballers in Jordan
Expatriate footballers in Saudi Arabia
Syrian expatriate sportspeople in Bahrain
Syrian expatriate sportspeople in Iraq
Syrian expatriate sportspeople in Jordan
Syrian expatriate sportspeople in Qatar
Syrian expatriate sportspeople in Saudi Arabia
Syrian expatriate footballers
People from Baniyas
Syrian Premier League players